BlackTV247 is an Internet-based video website which features Black inspired programming. The site has over 16 different channels and claims to have the world's largest library of Black inspired programming.

BlackTV247 employs a two-pronged programming strategy whereby it both hosts programming on its own network and links to programming hosted on external networks. Although the majority of the programming on BlackTV247 is produced by third parties, the site also broadcasts its own original programs including, The Best of BlackTV247.com and BlackTV247 News.

BlackTV247 debuted on January 27, 2010 and is a wholly owned subsidiary of Los Angeles-based BTV247, Inc and was conceived by BTV247, Inc. founders, Justin Beckett and Cecil Cox.

Channels 
, BlackTV247 has over 16 different channels including TV. Film, Comedy, Sports, Shorts, Music Video, Critic's Choice, Faith Based, Politics, Dance, Business, International, Education, Music Programming, Lifestyle and Haiti Relief.

Original Programming 
BlackTV247's sister company, BTV Productions, provides the network and its affiliates with original programming. Examples of the type of original programming that appears on BlackTV247 includes The Trial of Huey Newton, developed in partnership with the Dr. Huey P. Newton Foundation, BlackTV247 News and the Best of BlackTV247.com, which features Miss Brittany Bell, Miss Arizona USA 2010.

Availability 
Over 75% of BlackTV247's content is viewable from anywhere in the world.

References

External links 
 Official Site
 Corporate Site
 BlackTV247.com Aggregates All Black TV, All the Time

American entertainment websites
Video hosting
Video on demand services